Theda is a feminine given name which may refer to:

Theda Bara (1885–1955), American silent film actress and sex symbol
Theda Marshall (1925–2005), player in the All-American Girls Professional Baseball League
Theda Skocpol (born 1947), American sociologist and political scientist
Theda Ukena (1432–1494), regent of the County of East Frisia from 1466 to about 1480
Theda Funnie, fictional character from the animated television series Doug

See also
Theodosia (disambiguation)
Theodora (disambiguation)